Maudez is a Breton saint who lived in the 5th or 6th century. He is also known as Maudé, Maudet (Breton French), Maodez or Modez (Breton), Maudetus (Latin), Mandé (French) and Mawes (in Cornwall). In the Breton calendar his feast is 18 November.

Biography 
Maudez is variously said to have come from Ireland, or Wales, but most sources say Brittany. He first settled on the south coast of Cornwall where the village of St Mawes took his name. There was a chapel dedicated to him that was subsequently abandoned during the reign of Elizabeth I. A second chapel was built by the Earl Temple on Church Hill in 1807; and rebuilt in 1881. St Mawes' Church was opened by the Bishop of Truro George Wilkinson on 5 December 1884. Local opinion holds that St. Mawes built the first landing at the harbor to help pilgrims access his Holy Well, which is preserved on nearby Grove Hill. 

Then he went to Brittany and tradition has it that he landed in Pleubian. From there, he visited many monasteries in the region of Tréguier, Dol and the country of Leon. he built his first hermitage at Lanmodez (enclosure of Modez or Maudez). Then he moved to the small deserted island of Gueldénez (now called Île Maudez] in the Bréhat archipelago. There he settled with two disciples, 
Budoc and Tudy of Landevennec probably in the second half of the 5th century. Traces of a beehive hut known as Forn Modez (Maudez's oven) are visible on the island. Budoc later founded on monastery on the nearby island of Laurea.

Veneration
Maudez is, after Yves, one of the most revered among the saints of Brittany. He is invoked mainly against fevers and snakes.

In the 9th century his relics were taken to Bourges and to Saint-Mandé (Saint-Maudez), near Paris to escape from the Normans. There a chapel was dedicated to Saint-Maudez. When they were returned to Brittany they were divided between nine churches. The church of Lennon, Finistère preserves a reliquary of Saint Maudez.

He is venerated at Saint Mawes in Cornwall and in the Isles of Scilly under the name 'Saint Mawes. St Mawes Day continues to be celebrated on 18 November. In Lanmodez, a pardon takes place on the 4th Sunday of August.

Legacy 
 The village of Saint-Maudez is in the canton of Plélan-le-Petit.
 More than 60 churches or chapels are dedicated to the saint, e.g. Guiscriff, Lanvellec.

Butler's account

The hagiographer Alban Butler ( 1710–1773) wrote in his Lives of the Fathers, Martyrs, and Other Principal Saints, under May 18,

References

Sources

Further reading 

 Maurice Carbonnell, Saint Maudez-- Saint Mandé: un maître du monachisme breton, 2009 An exhaustive study which surveys the whole range of aspects of this saint: history, legend, veneration, and etymology. Also available as an illustrated volume of 172 p. .

Maudez
Year of birth unknown
Year of death unknown
Holy wells in Cornwall
6th-century Breton people